Knockadoon Head is a headland and national nature reserve with Capel Island of approximately  located in County Cork, Ireland. It is partly managed by the Irish National Parks & Wildlife Service, with areas under private ownership.

Features
Capel Island and Knockadoon Head were legally protected as a national nature reserve by the Irish government in 1985. Most of the reserve, is owned by the state, with a small part in private ownership . The reserve includes Capel Island, Knockadoon Head and the area of sea between.

Knockadoon Head has a signal tower, which was built in 1803 to warn of French invasion. It was abandoned in 1815. The reserve has a looped cliff walk.

In 2003, a Hume's Warbler was recorded at Knockadoon Head, the first record of this bird in Ireland.

References

Geography of County Cork
Nature reserves in the Republic of Ireland
Tourist attractions in County Cork
Protected areas established in 1985
1985 establishments in Ireland